Onkar Dattaram Gurav (born 10 October 1982 in Guntur, Andhra Pradesh) is an Indian cricketer who plays for Andhra Pradesh. He is right-hand wicket-keeper batsman.

References

External links
 

1982 births
Living people
Indian cricketers
Andhra cricketers
Cricketers from Guntur
Wicket-keepers